Ptychodus (from   'fold' and   'tooth') is a genus of extinct durophagous (shell-crushing) sharks from the Late Cretaceous. Fossils of Ptychodus teeth are found in many Late Cretaceous marine sediments. There are many species among the Ptychodus that have been uncovered on all the continents around the globe. Such species are Ptychodus mortoni, P. decurrens, P. marginalis, P. mammillaris, P. rugosus and P. latissimus to name a few. They died out approximately 85 million years ago. A large number of remains have been found in the former Western Interior Seaway. A 2016 publication found that Ptychodus are likely true sharks belonging to Selachimorpha, rather than hybodonts or batoids as previously thought. Their life history coincides with the typical life of many other large sharks: they lived relatively long lives and were slow growing and produced large offspring and small litters.

Discovery

Due to a global distribution Ptychodus is well represented in the fossil record; many fossils have been uncovered such as isolated teeth, fragments of dentition, calcified vertebral centra, denticles, and associated fragments of calcified cartilage. The very first remains of Ptychodus were found in England and Germany in the first half of the 18th century.  Ptychodus teeth have long been identified as palates of diodon, or porcupinefish (Osteichthyes, Diodontidae), well-known for their ability to inflate their bodies in defense. At the beginning of the 19th century, several authors including Swiss paleontologist Louis Agassiz eventually demonstrated the affinities of Ptychodus teeth with those of elasmobranchs (rays and sharks). The first discovery of Ptychodus teeth in Kansas came in 1868 when Leidy reported and described a damaged tooth near Fort Hays, Kansas. After, many more teeth were uncovered in almost perfect conditions and other species within the genus were identified. Fossils of species within this genus have been found in the marine strata of United States, Brazil, Canada, the Czech Republic, France, Germany, India, Israel, Japan, Jordan, Mexico, Sweden, and the United Kingdom. The fact that so many fossils of Ptychodus have been found in different regions of the world provides evidence of a distribution of species during the Albian-Turonian time.

Description

Unlike the colossal nektonic planktivores Rhincodon (whale sharks) and Cetorhinus (basking sharks) which relied upon gill rakers to acquire their food, the Ptychodus had a massive arrangement of crushing plate teeth. A Ptychodus jaw contains many teeth, up to 550 teeth, 220 of which are on the lower jaw and 260 in the upper jaw. These teeth were very large as well—Paleontologists believe that the largest tooth plate measured 55 centimeters in length and 45 centimeters in width. There are two distinct formations of tooth plates between the genus; one being juxtaposed, non-overlapping tooth rows, and another being imbricated tooth rows. It is believed that the shape coincides with the diet of the species and their geographic locations, but the time it lived has a big part as well. Ptychodus marginalis teeth differ from Ptychodus polygyrus. P marginalis was in the Middle Cenomanian to Middle Turonian deposits in the English Chalk, while P. polygyrus was in the Late Santonian-Early Campanian deposits.

Paleobiology
While there is no solid evidence of members of the Ptychodus species living among other durophagous sharks like members of Heterodontidae (bullhead sharks), it is believed that this Cretaceous macropredator was the precursor to crushing plate teeth seen in many similar sharks and rays. Ptychodus would have predated benthic shelled invertebrates, however Ptychodus itself was probably not benthic but more likely to be pelagic. It is believed that Ptychodus species not only preferred this area because of the subtropical environment but due to the higher concentration of their prey source Cremnoceramus, Volviceramus and other members of the inoceramids.

Diet
Diets of Ptychodus, for example P. decurrens (found in southern India) were probably animals with hard shells. Bivalves and ammonites are example of shelled invertebrates that are probably main food source of Ptychodus. Platyceramus, genus that includes one of the largest bivalves at the time, is able to be a part of the diet of Ptychodus. The Ptychodus diet in each species slightly differed based on the region they came from. The Paraptychodus washitaensis species (found in north-central Texas, USA.) has a dental structure similar to that of its ancestors (Ptychodus), however, its posterior teeth have a sharply raised and pointed tooth crown- a feature not predominantly present in its ancestors. The presence of the sharply raised and pointed tooth crown compared to the flat, wide crowns designed to crush prey also indicates a shift from eating mostly hard-shelled organisms to other types of organisms that have tough skeletons or exoskeletons.

Gallery

References

 Williston, Samuel (1900) University Geological Survey of Kansas, Volume VI: Paleontology part II, (Carboniferous invertebrates and Cretaceous fish)

External links

 
BBC page on Ptychodus mortoni: "Giant predatory shark fossil unearthed in Kansas"

Prehistoric shark genera
Cretaceous sharks

Taxa named by Charles Lucien Bonaparte
Mooreville Chalk
Taxa named by Louis Agassiz